Pycnophyes is a genus of worms belonging to the family Pycnophyidae.

The genus has cosmopolitan distribution.

Species:

Pycnophyes alexandroi 
Pycnophyes almansae 
Pycnophyes ancalagon 
Pycnophyes apotomus 
Pycnophyes aulacodes 
Pycnophyes beaufortensis 
Pycnophyes biserratus 
Pycnophyes chiliensis 
Pycnophyes communis 
Pycnophyes conspicuus 
Pycnophyes curvatus 
Pycnophyes denticulatus 
Pycnophyes diffusus 
Pycnophyes echinoderoides 
Pycnophyes egyptensis 
Pycnophyes frequens 
Pycnophyes giganteus 
Pycnophyes ilyocryptus 
Pycnophyes kukulkan 
Pycnophyes longihastatus 
Pycnophyes longisetosus 
Pycnophyes moderatus 
Pycnophyes naviculus 
Pycnophyes neuhausi 
Pycnophyes newguiniensis 
Pycnophyes newzealandiensis 
Pycnophyes norenburgi 
Pycnophyes oshoroensis 
Pycnophyes paraneapolitanus 
Pycnophyes parasanjuanensis 
Pycnophyes rectilineatus 
Pycnophyes robustus 
Pycnophyes sanjuanensis 
Pycnophyes schornikovi 
Pycnophyes solidus 
Pycnophyes stenopygus 
Pycnophyes tenuis 
Pycnophyes tubuliferus 
Pycnophyes validus 
Pycnophyes zelinkaei

References

Kinorhyncha